Péter Nógrádi (born in Budapest in 1952) is a Hungarian composer. He studied with Pál Károlyi Pál, and at the Franz Liszt Academy of Music with József Soproni.

References

Hungarian composers
Hungarian male composers
Musicians from Budapest
1952 births
Living people
Date of birth missing (living people)
21st-century Hungarian male musicians